Gamma-aminobutyric acid B receptor, 1 (GABAB1), is a G-protein coupled receptor subunit encoded by the GABBR1 gene.

Function 

GABAB1 is a receptor for Gamma-aminobutyric acid. Upon binding, GABAB1 will produce a slow and prolonged inhibitory effect. GABAB1 is one part of a heterodimer, which is the GABAB receptor, consisting of it and the related GABAB2 protein. The GABA(B) receptor 1 gene is mapped to chromosome 6p21.3 within the HLA class I region close to the HLA-F gene. Susceptibility loci for multiple sclerosis, epilepsy, and schizophrenia have also been mapped in this region.  Alternative splicing of this gene generates 4 transcript variants.

Interactions 

GABBR1 has been shown to interact with ATF4 and GABBR2.

See also
 GABAB receptor

References

Further reading

External links

G protein-coupled receptors